Lizette Cabrera was the defending champion, but chose to compete at the 2022 Melbourne Summer Set instead.

Ysaline Bonaventure won the title, defeating Victoria Jiménez Kasintseva in the final, 6–3, 6–1.

Seeds

Draw

Finals

Top half

Bottom half

References

External Links
Main Draw

Bendigo International - Singles